Clive Graham (7 October 1937 in Swansea– 11 June 2007) was a British television actor.

He had a lengthy career, roles included Robin of Locksley in Ivanhoe.

References

External links 

1937 births
2007 deaths
Male actors from Swansea
British male television actors
20th-century British male actors
21st-century British male actors